TBK1 may refer to:
 TANK-binding kinase 1, an enzyme
 IkappaB kinase, an enzyme